Tighten Up Vol. 88 is the third studio album by English band Big Audio Dynamite, released in June 1988 by Columbia Records. The album peaked at No. 33 on the UK Albums Chart and at No. 102 on the Billboard 200 but was their first not to receive a certification.

The album derives its name from the Tighten Up compilation album series by Trojan Records. The album's cover artwork was designed by Paul Simonon, the former bassist for the Clash, of whom Mick Jones was a member. Big Audio Dynamite's keyboardist Dan Donovan took the back cover photo with Josh Cheuse.

Track listing

"The Battle of All Saints Road" includes "Battle of New Orleans" (Traditional) and "Dueling Banjos" (Arthur Smith)

Personnel
Credits are adapted from the Tighten Up Vol. 88 liner notes.

Big Audio Dynamite
 Mick Jones — vocals; guitar
 Don Letts	— sound effects; vocals
 Dan Donovan — keyboards; vocals
 Greg Roberts — drums; vocals
 Leo "E-Zee Kill" Williams — bass; vocals

Production and artwork
 Mick Jones — producer
 Adam "Flea" Newman — "dynamite"
 Adele — crew
 Josh — Grand Poo-Bah
 Tricia — public relations
 Paul "Groucho" Smykle — engineer
 Paul Simonon — cover painting

References

External links

1988 albums
Big Audio Dynamite albums
Columbia Records albums